Zamalek water polo team, commonly known as Zamalek S.C, often referred to as Zamalek Pool Club is one of Zamalek SC club's sections that represent the club in Egypt and international water polo competitions, the club team section based in Giza

Honors

National achievements

Egyptian League :
 Winners ( 6 titles):

Egyptian Cup : 
 Winners ( 6 titles):

Regional achievements

Water polo Arab Clubs Championship
 Winners (1 titles):''' 1988.

Technical and managerial staff

Water polo clubs in Egypt
1955 establishments in Egypt
Sports clubs established in 1955
Sport in Giza